The Texas Kickoff was an annual college football game played on the opening weekend of the college football season in Houston, Texas, at NRG Stadium. The game was sponsored by Advocare from 2013 to 2019 and known officially as the Advocare Texas Kickoff and by Good Sam in 2021 as the Good Sam Texas Kickoff. Due to flooding in Houston from Hurricane Harvey, the 2017 game was relocated to the Mercedes-Benz Superdome (now Caesars Superdome) in New Orleans where the Louisiana Kickoff has been held since 2022.

Game results

Rankings are from the AP Poll. TV viewers are from Sports Media Watch.

2013
The 2013 AdvoCare Texas Kickoff was the inaugural event in the series and matched the unranked Mississippi State Bulldogs of the Southeastern Conference (SEC) against the No. 13 Oklahoma State Cowboys of the Big 12 Conference on August 31, 2013 at Reliant Stadium in Houston, Texas.  The Cowboys decisively defeated the Bulldogs 21–3.

2014
The second edition of the Kickoff featured the No. 14 Wisconsin Badgers of the Big Ten Conference and the No. 13 LSU Tigers of the Southeastern Conference (SEC) and was played on August 30, 2014 at NRG Stadium in Houston.  This became official when school officials from the participating teams agreed to play in this kickoff classic on August 23, 2013.  It was the third time the Badgers and Tigers met on the football field, with the Tigers prevailing 28–24.

2015
The 2015 matchup between Texas A&M of the Southeastern Conference (SEC) and Arizona State of the Pac-12 Conference was announced on November 22, 2013.  Heading into the game, Texas A&M was unranked while Arizona State was ranked 15th in the preseason AP poll.  The game was close through three quarters, with the Aggies outscoring the Sun Devils 21–3 in the fourth quarter to secure the win.

2016
The fourth edition of the Kickoff featured the No. 15 Houston Cougars of the American Athletic Conference and the No. 3 Oklahoma Sooners of the Big 12 Conference, and was played on September 3, 2016 at NRG Stadium in Houston.  The game was publicly announced on September 8, 2014.  At game time, Houston was under consideration for Big 12 membership along with several other schools.  The Big 12 chose not to expand several weeks later after Houston beat Oklahoma 33–23.  The Sooners went on to win the Big 12 title with a 9-0 conference record becoming the first Advocare Texas Kickoff participant to win its conference. The game featured a rare "kick six" as Houston defensive back Brandon Wilson returned a missed field goal 110 yards for a touchdown.

2017
On January 8, 2015 the Advocare Texas Kickoff announced that the LSU Tigers would face the BYU Cougars on September 2, 2017 at NRG Stadium.  However, due to the tremendous flooding from Hurricane Harvey hitting the Houston metro area, the game was relocated to the Mercedes-Benz Superdome in New Orleans, Louisiana. The Tigers shut out the Cougars 27–0.

2020
The 2020 game was cancelled due to the COVID-19 pandemic. The game was to be played between Baylor of the Big 12 Conference and Ole Miss from the SEC.

2021
The 2021 game was between Texas Tech of the Big 12 Conference and Houston of the American Athletic Conference. Texas Tech won the game 38–21 after being down 7–21 at halftime.

Future Games

Records

By team

By conference

References

External links
 

College football kickoff games
American football in Houston
2013 establishments in Texas
Recurring sporting events established in 2013